James "Jimmie" Ward (born July 18, 1991) is an American football cornerback and free safety for the Houston Texans of the National Football League (NFL). He played college football at Northern Illinois, and was drafted by the San Francisco 49ers in the first round of the 2014 NFL Draft.

Early years
Born in Racine, Wisconsin, Ward attended Davidson High School in Mobile, Alabama. He led the Warriors in tackles as a senior with 101 tackles, 73 solo, as Davidson went 10-3 and advanced to the state quarterfinals, while earning team Defensive MVP honors. Ward also recorded eight pass break-ups, an interception, forced two fumbles and recovered three. He added three blocked kicks and three quarterback sacks. As a junior, Ward made 93 tackles, broke up seven passes and intercepted five. He also caused a pair of fumbles and blocked two kicks. He is the cousin of former NBA player Caron Butler.

Ward was considered a two-star recruit by Rivals.com.

College career
Ward attended Northern Illinois University from 2010 to 2013. In 2010, Ward played in all 14 games as a true freshman and blocked a school-record three punts on the year. He also recorded 21 tackles, a forced fumble and a pass break up, and was named the Huskies Special Teams Player of the Year and Freshman of the Year. In 2011, he appeared in all 14 games, and started 12. He was named a third-team All-MAC selection after recording a career-high 100 tackles, 2.5 tackles for loss, an interception, four pass breakups, a forced fumble and a blocked kick. In 2012, he led the Huskies with 104 tackles, including a career game high 14 against Florida State in the Orange Bowl. He also recorded three interceptions while starting 13 games, earning himself first-team All-MAC honors. In 2013, he led the Huskies in tackles (95), interceptions (7) and pass deflections (12), while earning national recognition as a third-team All-American by the Associated Press. He also earned first-team All-MAC honors for the second consecutive season.

Professional career
Coming out of Northern Illinois, Ward was projected to be a first or second round pick by the majority of NFL draft experts and scouts. He received an invitation to the NFL combine as a top defensive back prospect, but was unable to participate in any physical running or jumping drills after discovering a stress fracture in his foot on the eve of the combine. On March 7, 2014, he opted to participate at Northern Illinois' pro day even though he was still injured and performed all of the combine drills except for the bench. Scouts and team representatives from 30 NFL teams attended Northern Illinois' pro day as Ward, Jordan Lynch, and five other teammates worked out. Ward attended five private workouts with teams, that included the Indianapolis Colts and Minnesota Vikings. He was ranked the top strong safety prospect in the draft by NFLDraftScout.com and was ranked the third best safety prospect by NFL analyst Mike Mayock and Sports Illustrated.

San Francisco 49ers
The San Francisco 49ers selected Ward in the first round (30th overall) of the 2014 NFL Draft. He was the third safety selected behind Calvin Pryor (18th overall, Jets) and HaHa Clinton-Dix (21st overall, Packers).

2014 season

On May 22, 2014, the 49ers signed Ward to a four-year, $7.11 million contract with $5.30 million guarantee and a signing bonus of $3.49 million.

Ward competed with Antoine Bethea and Craig Dahl throughout training camp for the starting strong safety position. Head coach Jim Harbaugh named Antoine Bethea the starting strong safety to begin the season and named Ward the backup free safety to Eric Reid. He was also tasked with nickel cornerback duties.

Ward made his NFL debut in the season-opener against the Dallas Cowboys and made one tackle during their 28-17 road victory. In the next game, he collected a season-high four solo tackles in a 20-28 loss to the Chicago Bears. The following week against the Arizona Cardinals, Ward recorded two solo tackles and a season-high two pass deflections in a 14-23 loss. He was unable to play during a Week 7 road loss to the Denver Broncos due to a quad injury. On November 9, 2014, he recorded two combined tackles during a 27-24 road victory over the New Orleans Saints. He suffered a foot injury during the game and was placed on injured reserve for the remainder of his rookie season.

Ward finished his rookie year with 20 combined tackles (19 solo) and two pass deflections in eight games.

2015 season

Ward returned to the San Francisco 49ers and was again named the backup free safety to Eric Reid under new head coach Jim Tomsula.

Ward made his first NFL start during the season-opener against the Minnesota Vikings and recorded a tackle in a 20-3 victory. During Week 5, he had eight combined tackles during a 27-30 road loss to the New York Giants. During Week 13, Ward made two combined tackles, deflected a pass, and his first career interception off of a pass attempt by Jay Cutler during a 26-20 road victory over the Chicago Bears. He also scored his first NFL touchdown during the game, after he returned his interception for 29-yards. Two weeks later against the Cincinnati Bengals, Ward made six combined tackles, deflected a pass, and made his first NFL sack on Andy Dalton as the 49ers lost 14-24. On January 3, 2016, he collected a season-high ten combined tackles and defended a pass in a 19-16 overtime win over the St. Louis Rams.

Ward finished his second season with career-high 57 combined tackles (48 solo), six pass deflections, a sack, an interception, and a touchdown in 16 games and eight started.

2016 season

Throughout his first two seasons, Ward was a backup free safety and was tasked with covering the slot. Head coach Chip Kelly was hired to replace Jim Tomsula after the San Francisco 49ers finished with a 5-11 record the previous season. In training camp, Ward was converted to a full-time cornerback and competed Kenneth Acker, Dontae Johnson, and Chris Davis for the job as the starting cornerback. Ward was named the starting cornerback, opposite Tramaine Brock, to begin the  season.

Ward started the season-opener against the Los Angeles Rams and collected three solo tackles and two pass deflections during a 28-0 shutout victory. Two weeks later against the Seattle Seahawks, he made a tackle and defended a pass during an 18-37 road loss. Unfortunately, Ward suffered a quad injury during a special teams play and was unable to play from Weeks 4-6. During Week 10, Ward made seven solo tackles and a season-high four pass deflections, as the 49ers lost to the Arizona Cardinals on the road by a score of 20-23. During Week 14 against the New York Jets, Ward had a career game as he recorded a season-high 11 combined tackles, deflected three passes, intercepted a pass attempt from quarterback Bryce Petty, and had his first sack of the season in the 17-23 overtime loss. In the next game, Ward recorded two solo tackles during a 13-41 road loss to the Atlanta Falcons. He left the game after suffering a fractured clavicle. On December 20, 2016, he was placed on injured reserve for the rest of the season.

Ward finished his third season with a total of 53 combined tackles (43 solo), a career-high 12 pass deflections, a sack, and an interception in 11 games and 10 starts.

2017 season

On May 1, 2017, the 49ers picked up the fifth-year option on Ward's rookie contract, paying him a salary of $8.52 million for the  season. At the beginning of training camp, new defensive coordinator Robert Saleh installed a cover 3 base defense and opted to move Ward back to his original position of free safety. This was his third different position in four seasons and his fourth head coach and defensive coordinator in that same span. Head coach Kyle Shanahan named Ward the starting free safety to begin the regular season. Ward suffered a hamstring injury and was unable to play in the season-opener against the Carolina Panthers and was replaced by Jaquiski Tartt.

On September 17, 2017, Ward made his season debut and recorded five combined tackles and deflected a pass in a 9-12 road loss to the Seattle Seahawks. The following week, he made his first start as a free safety and collected a season-high seven solo tackles during a narrow 39-41 loss to the Los Angeles Rams. During Week 8, Ward made three combined tackles in a 10-33 road loss to the Philadelphia Eagles. He left the game after suffering a fractured forearm. On November 1, 2017, Ward was placed on injured reserve for the remainder of the season.

Ward finished the 2017 season with a total of 32 combined tackles (27 solo) and a pass deflection in six starts and seven games. Pro Football Focus gave him an overall grade of 46.9, ranking him 77th among all qualified safeties in 2017.

2018 season

In 2018, Ward played in nine games with seven starts, recording 24 tackles and a forced fumble. During a Week 12 27-9 road loss to the Tampa Bay Buccaneers, Ward suffered a broken forearm. He was placed on injured reserve on November 27, 2018.

2019 season

On March 13, 2019, Ward signed a one-year, $4.5 million contract extension with the 49ers.

In Super Bowl LIV against the Kansas City Chiefs, Ward recorded a team high 11 tackles during the 31–20 loss.

2020 season
On March 24, 2020, Ward signed a three-year, $28.5 million contract extension with the 49ers.
In Week 12 against the Los Angeles Rams, Ward forced fumbles on Jared Goff and Malcolm Brown that were both recovered by the 49ers during the 23–20 win.

2021 season
In the divisional round against the Green Bay Packers, Ward blocked a 39 yard field goal attempted by the Packers kicker, Mason Crosby.

2022 season
On August 31, 2022, Ward was placed on injured reserve. He was activated on October 8. Ward was moved to nickel cornerback with the emerging play of safety Tashaun Gipson.

Houston Texans
On March, 18, 2023, Ward signed a two-year contract with the Houston Texans.

References

External links
San Francisco 49ers bio
Northern Illinois Huskies bio

Living people
1991 births
Players of American football from Alabama
American football safeties
American football cornerbacks
Northern Illinois Huskies football players
San Francisco 49ers players
Houston Texans players
Sportspeople from Mobile, Alabama